Fuckin' A is the eighth and final full-length album by American grindcore band Anal Cunt. It was released digitally on August 10, 2010, and then physically on January 11, 2011. The album is intended to be a parody of "cock rock" bands such as Mötley Crüe and Buckcherry and its cover uses the same image as Mötley Crüe's debut album Too Fast for Love. Some versions of the CD cover had the umlaut in "Anal" moved to the N, and a completely different font for the album title.

Many songs that are in the band's signature grindcore style were recorded during the Fuckin' A sessions and were released on an EP titled Wearing Out Our Welcome in 2010. The band initially planned to release an eighth studio album titled The Same Old Shit which would contain both the "cock rock" songs and the grindcore songs together, but ultimately decided to release them separately.

Track listing

Personnel
Anal Cunt
 Seth Putnam – vocals, production, mixing
 Josh Martin – guitars, backing vocals
 Tim Morse – drums, backing vocals

Additional personnel
 Anal Cunt – arrangement
 Ken Cmar – backing vocals, recording, mixing
 "The Honorable Reverend Fuckface Chainsaw" (Vaginal Jesus), "Jim Crow" (Mudoven), "The Whipping Bastard" (The Raunchous Brothers), Julie Putnam – backing vocals on "Yay! It's Pink"

References

Anal Cunt albums
2011 albums